Aptekar is a surname. Notable people with the surname include:

Lev Aptekar (born 1936), Soviet-New Zealand chess master, coach, and writer
Valerian Borisovich Aptekar (1899–1937), Russian historian and linguist